The 2005 SEC women's basketball tournament took place March 3–6, 2005, at the Bi-Lo Center, now known as Bon Secours Wellness Arena, in Greenville, South Carolina.

Tennessee won the tournament by beating LSU in the championship game.

Tournament

Asterisk denotes game ended in overtime.

All-Tournament team 
Tasha Humphrey, Georgia
Seimone Augustus, LSU
Temeka Johnson, LSU
Armintie Price, Ole Miss
Shyra Ely, Tennessee (MVP)
Brittany Jackson, Tennessee
Shanna Zolman, Tennessee
Ashley Earley, Vanderbilt

References

SEC women's basketball tournament
Women's sports in South Carolina
2005 in sports in South Carolina
College basketball tournaments in South Carolina
Basketball competitions in Greenville, South Carolina